United Nations Security Council resolution 1530, adopted unanimously on 11 March 2004, after reaffirming the principles of the United Nations Charter and Resolution 1373 (2001), the council condemned the train bombings in Madrid, Spain, on 11 March 2004. It was passed hours after the attacks.

The Security Council reaffirmed the need to combat threats to international peace and security caused by terrorist acts and condemned the bomb attacks in Madrid, in which many people died and people injured. It mistakenly identified the Basque separatist group ETA as responsible for the attacks. It expressed sympathy and condolences to the families of the victims and the people and government of Spain.

The resolution called upon all states to co-operate to bring the perpetrators to justice in accordance with their obligations under Resolution 1373. Finally, the council concluded by expressing its determination to combat all forms of terrorism.

See also
 List of terrorist incidents
 List of United Nations Security Council Resolutions 1501 to 1600 (2003–2005)

References

External links
 
Text of the Resolution at undocs.org

 1530
2004 in Spain
 1530
 1530
March 2004 events